() is a Japanese regional bank headquartered in the city of Akita, Akita Prefecture. Although the bank’s core business comes from Akita prefecture, various branches are situated outside of the area. These include Koriyama, Sapporo, Morioka, Sendai, and Tokyo. The bank was noted for its initial reluctance to establish a wide ATM network, finally implementing one in January 2003.

Profile
Total Assets: Approximately ¥2.6 trillion 
SWIFT Code: AKITJPJT
Employees: 1,554
Branches: 98 (83 Within Akita Prefecture)
President: Takao Minatoya
Member: Regional Banks Association of Japan

History
The bank was privatized in January, 1889, becoming . The former Akita branch of the First National Bank was dissolved in May 1896, becoming the Akita Bank. These three banks merged on October 20, 1941, to form the present Akita Bank. The bank was listed on the second section of the Tokyo Stock Exchange from April 1973, and of the first section of the Tokyo Stock Exchange from April 1974.
While the former mascot for the bank had been Woody Woodpecker (along with Winnie Woodpecker), the current mascot is Astro Boy.

See also
List of banks
List of banks in Japan

References

External links
  Official site 
  Bloomberg Report
   Akita Bank Hoovers Report
  Wiki collection of bibliographic works on Akita Bank

Companies based in Akita Prefecture
Regional banks of Japan
Companies listed on the Tokyo Stock Exchange
Banks established in 1879
Japanese companies established in 1879